Michael Bailey Smith (born November 2, 1957) is an American actor. He is best known for his appearances on the television series Charmed, where he played Belthazor, a Grimlock leader and Shax.

Early life 
Smith was born in Alpena, Michigan, to an Air Force family, which lived in Tehran, Iran, during his last two years of high school. He graduated from Tehran American School. After working for Westinghouse, he joined the United States Army where he served in the 82nd Airborne Division as a paratrooper. He then attended college at Eastern Michigan University, where his athletic talents earned him a spot as a free agent with the Dallas Cowboys in 1985. Smith's football career was cut short by injury and he returned to Eastern Michigan University, where in 1988 he earned a bachelor of science degree in computer aided design.

Career 
Smith stumbled upon acting when he accompanied a friend to an audition for the 1989 film A Nightmare on Elm Street 5: The Dream Child. Smith landed the role of Super Freddy. Smith would appear three years later in a small role in Renegade playing PJ Butler. In 1994, he appeared in an unreleased Marvel Comics adaptation of The Fantastic Four as Ben Grimm. Smith was also cast in Cyborg 3: The Recycler alongside Malcolm McDowell.

Smith appeared in many TV series, such as Diagnosis: Murder, Star Trek: Voyager, Wings and Conan the Adventurer. In 1999, Smith had small roles as guards in Donald Petrie's My Favorite Martian (film) and The X-Files. Smith appeared 18 times in the hit TV show Charmed, where he played Belthazor, The Source, Grimlock and Shax. Also in 2002, he appeared in the hit sequel Men in Black II, where he portrayed the character Creepy. In 2003, Smith was brother Bob (Monster Man) in the hit movie Monster Man. Around that time, he appeared in the TV series The O.C. and Desperate Housewives.

In 2006, Smith was cast as villain Pluto in the remake of The Hills Have Eyes. In 2007, he played villain Papa Hades in The Hills Have Eyes 2. He also starred in the 2010 horror film Chain Letter, alongside Nikki Reed, and Noah Segan, directed by Deon Taylor.

Smith has also maintained a career outside of acting; he currently works for LEXI as the VP of Global IoT Sales.

Filmography

Film and Television 
 1989 A Nightmare on Elm Street 5: The Dream Child as Super Freddy
 1992 CIA Code Name: Alexa as Vlad
 1992 Renegade as P.J. Butler
 1993 Silk Stalkings as Lonnie Brill
 1994 Cyborg 3: The Recycler as Donovan Cyborg
 1994 Ice as Jimmy, The Courier
 1994 Cage II as Sampo Fighter (uncredited)
 1994 The Fantastic Four as Ben Grimm
 1995 The Best of the Best 3: No Turning Back as "Tiny"
 1995 Babylon 5 as G'Dok
 1995-1996 Murphy Brown as Wrestler Secretary #74 and Secretary #74
 1995 The Home Court as Man #2
 1996 Family Matters as "Snap"
 1996 The Drew Carey Show as Big Guy #1
 1996 Wings as Jaffra
 1996 Space Marines as Gunther
 1996 Star Trek: Voyager as Alien #1
 1997 Lawless as Bob "Obituary Bob"
 1997 Malcolm & Eddie as Steven
 1997 Conan as Gokrey
 1998 Diagnosis Murder as Guard #1
 1998 Between Brothers as The Guy
 1998 Arli$$
 1998 Whatever It Takes as Kevin Thompson
 1998-1999 Seven Days as Brenneman
 1999 My Favorite Martian as Big Guard
 1999 Unconditional Love
 1999 The X-Files as Guard
 1999 L.A. Heat as Terry King
 1999 Final Voyage as Erickson
 1999 Martial Law as Lead Henchman
 2000 Little Man on Campus as Chuck
 2000 V.I.P. as "Tomahawk"
 2000 Submerged as Lieutenant Nick Stuart
 2000 Buffy the Vampire Slayer as Toth
 2000 Love Her Madly as "Big Red"
 2000 Bad Guys as Right Hand Man
 2000-2001 Nash Bridges as Mike "Iron Mike" Willis
 2000-2002 Charmed as Belthazor / Shax / Grimlock / The Source / Janor
 2001 Roswell as Casino Guard
 2001 Town & Country as Guard #2
 2001 To Protect and Serve as Chuck
 2001 Circuit as Mike
 2001 Philly as George
 2002 Grounded for Life as Jack
 2002 Malcolm in the Middle as Coach
 2002 The Division as "Skull" Corbett
 2002 Undisputed as Willard Bechtel
 2002 Inside as Bo
 2002 Purpose as The Bouncer
 2002 Men in Black II as "Creepy"
 2002 The Master of Disguise as Henchman
 2002 Blood Shot as Vampire
 2002 Fastlane as Thick Neck Who's Talking (uncredited)
 2002 Black Mask 2: City of Masks as "Hellraiser" Ross
 2002 The Truth About Beef Jerky as Dick
 2003 She Spies as Lucus Winter
 2003 In Hell as Valya
 2003 Monster Man as Monster Man
 2004 Oliver Beene as Mauler Madson
 2004 Short Fuse: A collection of Explosive Shorts as Bo
 2005 The O.C. as Joe
 2005 Candy Paint as Rick Adler
 2005 The Unknown as Manny
 2005 Jane Doe: The Wrong Face as Jackson
 2005 Desperate Housewives as Bob
 2006-2007 My Name is Earl as Skinhead #1 / Skinhead Prisoner
 2006 Spymate as Hugo
 2006 The Hills Have Eyes as Pluto
 2006 Pepper Dennis as Police Officer
 2007 Careless as Neighbor #2
 2007 The Hills Have Eyes II as Papa Hades
 2009 Thirsty as The Thrill Killer
 2010 Chain Letter as Chain Man
 2010 Days of Our Lives as Bernie
 2010 Bad Ass as Brooklyn Bridges
 2010 Crime Scene X: Creepy Crawlies as Detective Dan Houston
 2010 Crime Scene X-Flames of Execution as Detective Dan Houston
 2010 The Visitation as Gabe
 2011 Chuck as Vlad
 2011 Pair of Kings as Zadoc
 2011 House as Sullivan
 2011 Two and a Half Men as Dave
 2012 Southland as Bobby Bedford
 2012 Shameless as Man In Dress
 2012 Eagleheart as The Bouncer
 2013 Blood Show as Vampire
 2014 Revelation Road: The Black Rider as Salinas
 2015 Black-ish as Security Guard
 2015 Cocked as Gunman
 2015 Kids vs. Monsters as Mr. Beet
 2016 Bus Driver as Jace

Video Games 
 1998 Cyber Strike 2
 2000 MechWarrior 4: Vengeance as Tarquin Cardona
 2002 Emperor: Battle for Dune as Burseg
 2002 Nightcaster: Defeat the Darkness

References

External links 
 

1957 births
Living people
Male actors from Michigan
American male film actors
American male television actors
Eastern Michigan University alumni
People from Alpena, Michigan
United States Army soldiers